Milford Huts is a bach community in the Timaru district and Canterbury region of New Zealand's South Island. Milford Huts is on the northern side of the Ōpihi River mouth, 7.5 kilometres southeast of Temuka by road.

The area is at risk of flooding from the river.

Demographics
The settlement is part of the larger Waitohi statistical area. 

7027292 had a population of 84 at the 2018 New Zealand census, an increase of 18 people (27.3%) since the 2013 census, and an increase of 24 people (40.0%) since the 2006 census. There were 36 households. There were 51 males and 33 females, giving a sex ratio of 1.55 males per female. The median age was 46.4 years (compared with 37.4 years nationally), with 12 people (14.3%) aged under 15 years, 12 (14.3%) aged 15 to 29, 42 (50.0%) aged 30 to 64, and 15 (17.9%) aged 65 or older.

Ethnicities were 85.7% European/Pākehā, 21.4% Māori, and 3.6% other ethnicities (totals add to more than 100% since people could identify with multiple ethnicities).

Although some people objected to giving their religion, 71.4% had no religion, 17.9% were Christian and 7.1% had other religions.

Of those at least 15 years old, 3 (4.2%) people had a bachelor or higher degree, and 30 (41.7%) people had no formal qualifications. The median income was $20,300, compared with $31,800 nationally. The employment status of those at least 15 was that 24 (33.3%) people were employed full-time, 3 (4.2%) were part-time, and 3 (4.2%) were unemployed.

See also
Selwyn Huts
Waipopo

References

Timaru District
Populated places in Canterbury, New Zealand